Roure is a commune located in the department of Alpes-Maritimes department in southeastern France in the Provence-Alpes-Côte d'Azur.
Its inhabitants are called Rourois. It is a medieval village with agro-pastoral architecture.

Geography
The village is accessible by road from Nice through the RN 202, towards Digne then 2205 RD, the RD 30 and RD 130. Also by path through the GR 5. The village contains five little villages: Rougios, lost in the mountains, Tiecs, la Cerise, Puch and Valabres where there was a priest and a school until 1904.

Toponymy
The first indication of the village dates from 1067 under the name "Rora", derived from the Latin word "robur" which means "oak". Villagers raised and tended cows and goat herds on behalf of their owners and concluded business under a large oak tree. Hence, the origin of the village's name.

Main sights
 Arboretum Marcel Kroenlein

See also
Communes of the Alpes-Maritimes department
Communes of the region Provence-Alpes-Côte d'Azur. Traditionally named Provence.

References

Communes of Alpes-Maritimes
Alpes-Maritimes communes articles needing translation from French Wikipedia